Viego is one of nine parishes (administrative divisions) in Ponga, a municipality within the province and autonomous community of Asturias, in northern Spain.

The population is 67 (INE 2007).

Villages and hamlets
 Viego 
 Viboli 

Parishes in Ponga